Moggill is an electoral district in the Legislative Assembly of Queensland in the state of Queensland, Australia. The electorate is held by Dr Christian Rowan, for the Liberal National Party of Queensland.

Moggill encompasses the suburbs on the south-western fringe of Brisbane, and is named for the suburb of Moggill.  It also includes Chapel Hill, Pullenvale, Brookfield, Kenmore, Karana Downs and Mount Crosby.  It had long been the most conservative seat in Brisbane. Indeed,  during the Labor landslides of 2001 and 2004, it was the only non-Labor seat in Brisbane. 

However, in recent years, it has become somewhat more marginal. At its height in 2012, the LNP sat on a majority of 23.9 percent, which was pared back to 8.2 percent in 2015, five percent in 2017 and three percent in 2020. Presently, it is one of only five non-Labor seats in the capital.

Most of the seat is located within the federal seat of Ryan.

History

The electoral district of Moggill was created in the 1986 redistribution combining part of the electoral district of Mount Coot-tha  with parts of the electoral district of Ipswich West. In 1991, a small portion east of the Centenary Highway was removed.

Members for Moggill

Election results

References

External links
 

Moggill